Lyndon Wallace James (born 27 December 1998) is an English cricketer. He made his first-class debut for Nottinghamshire in the 2018 County Championship on 10 September 2018. He made his List A debut on 1 May 2019, for Nottinghamshire in the 2019 Royal London One-Day Cup. He made his Twenty20 debut on 13 June 2021, for Nottinghamshire in the 2021 T20 Blast.

In April 2022, in the 2022 County Championship, James scored his maiden century in first-class cricket.

References

External links
 

1998 births
Living people
English cricketers
Nottinghamshire cricketers
Place of birth missing (living people)
English cricketers of the 21st century